Roberto Zandonella (born 14 April 1944) is an Italian bobsledder who competed in the late 1960s and early 1970s. He won a gold medal in the four-man event at the 1968 Winter Olympics in Grenoble.

Zandonella also won two medals in the four-man event at the FIBT World Championships with a gold in 1970 and a silver in 1969.

References
 Bobsleigh four-man Olympic medalists for 1924, 1932-56, and since 1964
 Bobsleigh four-man world championship medalists since 1930
 Wallenchinsky, David (1984). "Bobsled: Four-man". In The Complete Book of the Olympics: 1896 - 1980. New York: Penguin Books. p. 561.
 Roberto Zandonella's profile at databaseOlympics

1944 births
Living people
Italian male bobsledders
Bobsledders at the 1968 Winter Olympics
Bobsledders at the 1972 Winter Olympics
Olympic bobsledders of Italy
Olympic gold medalists for Italy
Olympic medalists in bobsleigh
Medalists at the 1968 Winter Olympics